Lagarostrobos franklinii is a species of conifer native to the wet southwestern corner of Tasmania, Australia. It is often known as the Huon pine or Macquarie pine, although it is actually a podocarp (Podocarpaceae), not a true pine (Pinaceae). It is the sole species in the genus Lagarostrobos; one other species L. colensoi (endemic to New Zealand) formerly included has been transferred to a new genus Manoao. The genus was also formerly included in a broader circumscription of the genus Dacrydium.

In molecular phylogenetic analyses Lagorostrobos was found to be related to Parasitaxus (a parasitic and monotypic genus from New Caledonia) and Manoao, but their exact relationships are unresolved.

The wood is highly prized for its golden yellow colour, fine grain, and natural oils that resist rotting. The chemical giving the timber its unique smell and preservative qualities is methyl eugenol.

It has been planted in the grounds of Crathes Castle, Aberdeenshire, Scotland and has done well.  Two healthy specimens can also be found at Torosay Castle, Isle of Mull.

Description

The Huon pine is a slow-growing, but long-lived tree; some living specimens of this tree are in excess of 2,000 years old. It is dioecious, with male (pollen) and female (seed) cones on separate plants. Unlike the closely related New Zealand genus Manoao, the scales do not become fleshy and are water-dispersed, not bird-dispersed.

Age
Huon pines are some of the oldest living organisms on the Earth.

A stand of trees in excess of 10,500 years old was found in 1955 in western Tasmania on Mount Read. Each of the trees in this stand is a genetically identical male that has reproduced vegetatively. Although no single tree in this stand is of that age, the stand itself as a single organism has existed that long.

Individual trees in the clonal patch have been listed as having ages of 2,000 or even to 3,000 years old.

Because of the long life of individual trees, tree rings from Huon Pine have been used for dendrochronology to establish a record of climate variation.

Conservation
An estimated 15% of its habitat has been lost through inundation for hydroelectric schemes and to fire over the past 100 years or so. Extensive logging in the past has removed nearly all large trees, but there is regrowth nearly everywhere. One stand of the species has been made available for access to craft wood from dead and downed timber under a strict licensing system. It is illegal to cut living trees.

See also
 List of superlative trees

References

Endemic flora of Tasmania
Trees of Australia
Pinales of Australia
Trees of mild maritime climate
Ornamental trees
Conservation dependent flora of Australia
Tasmanian forests
 
Monotypic conifer genera
Podocarpaceae genera
Podocarpaceae